Eteoryctis gemoniella is a moth of the family Gracillariidae. It is known from West Bengal, India.

The larvae feed on Anacardium occidentale, Lannea coromandelica, Semecarpus anacardium, Achras sapota, Madhuca indica, Madhuca latifolia and Manilkara zapota. They probably mine the leaves of their host plant.

References

Acrocercopinae
Moths of Asia
Moths described in 1862